This article lists the squads for the 2014 FIFA U-17 Women's World Cup, to be held in Costa Rica. Each competing federation is allowed a 21-player squad, which had to be submitted to FIFA.

Group A

Costa Rica
Coach:  Juan Diego Quesada

Venezuela
Coach:  Kenneth Zseremeta

Italy
Coach:  Enrico Sbardella

Zambia
Coach:  Albert Kachinga

Group B

Ghana
Coach:  Evans Adotey

Germany
Coach:  Anouschka Bernhard

North Korea
Coach:  Sin Ui-Gun

Canada
Coach: Beverly Priestman

Group C

Spain
Coach:  Jorge Vilda

New Zealand
Coach:  Jitka Klimková

Paraguay
Coach:  Julio Gómez

Japan

Coach:  Asako Takakura

Group D

Mexico
Coach:  Leonardo Cuéllar

China PR
Coach:  Gao Hong

Colombia
Coach:  Fabian Taborda

Nigeria
Coach:  Nikyu Bala

References

FIFA U-17 Women's World Cup squads
2014 in youth sport